Kasim Ishmael Amu-Kadar Aidoo (born 3 November 2001) is an Professional English Footballer who plays as a Defender for Isthmian League club Potters Bar Town.

Career

Charlton Athletic

He made his debut for Charlton Athletic on 10 November 2020 in a 3–1 EFL Trophy victory over Leyton Orient.

On 18 May 2021, it was announced that Aidoo would leave Charlton Athletic at the end of his contract.

Eastbourne Borough
On 28 August 2021, Aidoo joined Eastbourne Borough. He made his debut the same day, playing against Oxford City.

Cray Wanderers
On 27 September 2021, Aidoo joined Cray Wanderers.

Potters Bar Town
After finishing the previous season at Cray Wanderers, Aidoo joined league rivals Potters Bar Town on 13 June 2022. He scored his first goal for the club in a FA cup win over Aveley on 6 September 2022.

Career statistics

References

External links
 

2000 births
Living people
English footballers
Association football midfielders
Charlton Athletic F.C. players
Eastbourne Borough F.C. players
Cray Wanderers F.C. players
Potters Bar Town F.C. players
Black British sportsmen